Ruslan Mamutov (born 19 August 1993 in Donetsk, Ukraine) is a professional Ukrainian football midfielder.

Career
Mamutov is product of youth team systems of FC Olimpik Donetsk and FC Metalurh Donetsk. He made his debut for FC Metalurh played in the start squad in the game against FC Dynamo Kyiv on 6 October 2013 in the Ukrainian Premier League.

References

External links
Club profile (Rus)
Profile at FFU Official Site (Ukr)
Ruslan Mamutov at FootballFacts.ru

1993 births
Living people
People from Rozdolne Raion
Ukrainian footballers
Ukrainian expatriate footballers
FC Metalurh Donetsk players
FC Stal Alchevsk players
FC Okean Kerch players
Ukrainian Premier League players
Crimean Premier League players
Ukrainian expatriate sportspeople in Armenia
Ukrainian expatriate sportspeople in Russia
Expatriate footballers in Armenia
Expatriate footballers in Russia
Association football midfielders